Henry Beasley (26 July 1919 – 17 January 1979) was an Australian rules footballer who played with Geelong in the Victorian Football League (VFL).

Family
The son of Richard Rickard Beasley (1873–1951), and Elizabeth Beasley (1883–1952), née Mackay, Henry Beasley was born at Forrest, Victoria on 26 July 1919.

He married Beryl Ester Lillian Kemmis (1919–2005) in 1940.

Football
He played in three First XVIII matches for Geelong in 1944.

Military service
He served with the Second AIF during World War Two.

Notes

References
 World War Two Nominal Roll: Private Henry Beasley (V36585), Department of Veterans' Affairs.

External links 

1919 births
1979 deaths
Australian rules footballers from Victoria (Australia)
Geelong Football Club players
Australian Army personnel of World War II
Australian Army soldiers